Petrus Guérin du Rocher (1731–1792) was a French Jesuit.

1731 births
1792 deaths
French beatified people
18th-century French Jesuits
French clergy killed in the French Revolution